Ahrensburg Ost is a station on the Großhansdorf branch of Hamburg U-Bahn line U1, located in the southeastern part of the town of Ahrensburg in Schleswig-Holstein.

History
The station was built in 1914 using schematics from Eugen Göbel, but didn't open with the rest of the stations on the Großhansdorf branch until a year later, in 1922 (under the name Hopfenbach) with only one track.

In 1952, the station's name was changed to its current name, Ahrensburg Ost.

The station has been altered very little, so that even today, it looks similar to the way it did at its opening.

Services
Ahrensburg Ost is served by Hamburg U-Bahn line U1.

References

U-Bahn Ost
U1 (Hamburg U-Bahn) stations
Hamburg U-Bahn stations in Schleswig-Holstein
Buildings and structures in Stormarn (district)
Transport infrastructure completed in 1914
Railway stations in Germany opened in 1922